Stevens Institute of Technology International (SITI) Spanish: "Stevens Instituto Especializado de Estudios Superiores” is a defunct private university in the Dominican Republic that offered technology and technology management education, taught in English.

The school was founded on July 18, 2006, and was associated with Stevens Institute of Technology, in Hoboken, New Jersey. SITI opened its doors on September 28, 2007. Its campus was at the Parque Cibernetico de Santo Domingo. SITI offered master's degrees in Information Systems and Manufacturing Technology. These programs required 40 credits including a masters thesis.

Harold J. Raveché, then President of the Stevens Institute of Technology, served as the Rector of SITI; the Vice-Rector was Lex McCusker, then Associate Dean of the Wesley J. Howe School of Technology Management at Stevens.

Raveché left Stevens in 2010, and in 2016 its corporate charter was dissolved.

References

External links 
 Stevens Institute of Technology International Official website 
 Contents - DR1 Student Guide Dominican Republic Student & University Guide

Universities in the Dominican Republic
Educational institutions established in 2006
Education in Santo Domingo
2006 establishments in the Dominican Republic